State Highway 67 (SH 67) is a State Highway in Kerala, India that starts in Mannarkulanji and ends in Pampa Thriveni Bridge. The highway is 44.1 km long.

Route map

See also 
Roads in Kerala
List of State Highways in Kerala

References 

State Highways in Kerala
Roads in Pathanamthitta district